Renfrew Leslie Christie (born 1949) is a South African scholar and member of the Anti-Apartheid Movement whose covert operations for uMkhonto we Sizwe, the paramilitary wing of the African National Congress, provided intelligence that made possible the 1982 bombing of the Koeberg Nuclear Power Station. Christie was arrested, tortured, and sentenced to 10 years in prison under the Terrorism Act, 1967 for giving information on the nuclear programme of South Africa to the ANC. His actions were intended to thwart the Apartheid regime of South Africa and weapons of mass destruction, specifically the government's clandestine nuclear arsenal. His work delayed the development of Apartheid South Africa's nuclear weapon programme by several years.

Christie was released in 1986 after accepting P.W. Botha's offer of freedom in exchange for his renunciation of political violence. 

After the fall of Apartheid, Christie resumed his academic career at the University of the Western Cape. When asked by the BBC in 2018 if he was proud to have spied for the ANC, Christie said, "Absolutely. I was working for Nelson Mandela's military force, the uMkhonto we Sizwe. I'm very proud of that. We won. We got a democracy. We got a bill of rights. We got a constitutional court. It worked."

Bibliography

References

External links
Audio interview for BBC World Service: Witness 	 
Video interview for South Africa: Overcoming Apartheid, Building Democracy
Online interview for Vice

1949 births
Living people
Members of the African National Congress
People convicted of spying
South African prisoners and detainees
Academic staff of the University of the Western Cape
White South African anti-apartheid activists
Members of the Academy of Science of South Africa